Uyir is a 2006 Tamil erotic thriller film  written and directed by Samy. Starring Srikanth, Sangeetha and Samvrutha Sunil, the film revolves around a woman who falls in love with her brother-in-law after the demise of her husband. The film was released on 30 June 2006. The film's music was composed by Joshua Sridhar.

Plot 
Sundar (Srikanth) moves in with his brother's family, consisting of his brother, sister-in-law Arundathi (Sangeetha) and their daughter Aishwarya (Ramya). Sundar becomes very close to all three of them, but unbeknownst to him, Arundathi is interested in him. Sundar drops his niece off at school every day and meets his girlfriend Anandi (Samvritha) there. His brother is excited to learn about their relationship but soon afterward commits suicide. Arundathi claims that his suicide was caused by problems at work. Sundar becomes obligated to take care of his late brother's family, as Arundathi and Aishwarya have nowhere else to go. Arundathi tries her best to end Sundar's relationship with Anandi while subtly hinting to Sundar about her love for him. Anandi tries to warn Sundar about his conniving sister-in-law, but Arundathi succeeds in her plan. Did Sundar get together with Anandi or not is rest of the plot.

Cast 
 Srikanth as Sundar
 Sangeetha as Arundathi
 Samvritha as Anandhi
 Baby Ramya as Aishwarya
 Asim Sharma as Sundar's brother
 Balaji

Soundtrack 
The album has 6 tracks.
 "Convent Sollitharum"
 "Udhadum Udhadum"
 "Aarum Ponnum"
 "Kann Simittum Nerame"
 "Uyir Theme Music"
 "Kanne Kadhal Nilame"

Release
The satellite rights of the film were sold to Raj TV. The film was given a "U/A" certificate by the Indian Censor Board.

References 

2000s erotic thriller films
Films about adultery in India
2006 films
2000s Tamil-language films
Indian erotic thriller films
Films scored by Joshua Sridhar